Yury Vitt (born 4 March 1980) is a Uzbekistani wrestler. He competed in the men's Greco-Roman 85 kg at the 2000 Summer Olympics.

References

1980 births
Living people
Uzbekistani male sport wrestlers
Olympic wrestlers of Uzbekistan
Wrestlers at the 2000 Summer Olympics
Place of birth missing (living people)
Wrestlers at the 1998 Asian Games
Asian Games competitors for Uzbekistan
20th-century Uzbekistani people